More info
Culex (Culiciomyia) nigropunctatus is a species of mosquito belonging to the genus Culex. It is found in Bangladesh, Borneo, Malaysia, Cambodia, China, Hong Kong, India, Indonesia, Japan, Laos, Malaysia, Micronesia (Wake Island), Nepal, Palau, Philippines, Singapore, Sri Lanka, Thailand, Taiwan, and Vietnam.

References

External links 
Seasonal Abundance of Larval Stage of Culex Species Mosquitoes (Diptera: Culicidae) in an Endemic Area of Japanese Encephalitis in Mysore, India

nigropunctatus
Insects described in 1922